Michał Gawłowski (born 28 July 1975) is a Polish tennis coach and former professional player.

A national junior champion in 1992 and 1993 ( singles, doubles and mixed), Gawłowski competed for the Poland Davis Cup team between 1996 and 1999, winning three singles and three doubles rubbers. His first singles win came in 1996 against Slovakia's Dominik Hrbatý and in 1999 he won the deciding fifth rubber of a tie against Latvia.

Gawłowski was the singles runner-up at the Polish national tennis championships on three occasions. He won three national indoor doubles titles, in 1995, 1997 and 1999.

On the ATP Tour, Gawłowski featured twice in the doubles main draw of the Sopot tournament.

Challenger titles

Doubles: (1)

See also
List of Poland Davis Cup team representatives

References

External links
 
 
 

1975 births
Living people
Polish male tennis players